, is the name of a number of characters and objects in Japanese traditional literature and drama.  It may refer to:

Anime and manga 
 , a character from the manga series Ceres, Celestial Legend
 , a character from the Kiznaiver anime series
 , a character from Persona 3
 , a character from the manga series Is the Order a Rabbit?
 , the female protagonist of Full Metal Panic!
 , a character in Koi Kaze
 The character prototype in the Brave Witches anime television series
 A skill in the Naruto series
 A katana in Katana Maidens ~ Toji No Miko

Other uses 
 Chidori, a neighborhood in Ōta, Tokyo
 Chidori (comedy duo), Japanese comedy duo consisting of Daigo and Nobu as the members
 Chidori-class torpedo boat, an Imperial Japanese Navy class of torpedo boats that served during the Second World War
 Chidori Station, a train station on the Kagoshima Main Line in Koga, Fukuoka, Japan
 A famous sword wielded by the Sengoku Period samurai Tachibana Dōsetsu

Japanese feminine given names
Japanese-language surnames